The cleansing of the Temple narrative tells of Jesus expelling the merchants and the money changers from the Temple, and is recounted in all four canonical gospels of the New Testament. The scene is a common motif in Christian art.

In this account, Jesus and his disciples travel to Jerusalem for Passover, where Jesus expels the merchants and consumers from the temple, accusing them of turning it into "a den of thieves" (in the Synoptic Gospels) and "a house of trade" (in Gospel of John) through their commercial activities.

Some scholars believe that these refer to two separate incidents, given that the Gospel of John also includes more than one Passover.

Description 

Jesus is stated to have visited the Temple in Jerusalem, where the courtyard is described as being filled with livestock, merchants, and the tables of the money changers, who changed the standard Greek and Roman money for Jewish and Tyrian shekels. Jerusalem was packed with Jews who had come for Passover, perhaps numbering 300,000 to 400,000 pilgrims.

 

Dove sellers were selling doves that were sacrificed by the poor who could not afford grander sacrifices and specifically by women. This occurred in the outermost court of the gentiles.

 says the Temple leaders questioned Jesus if he was aware the children were shouting "Hosanna to the Son of David." Jesus responded by saying "from the lips of children and infants you have ordained praise."

Chronology

There are debates about when the cleansing of the Temple occurred and whether there were two separate events. St. Thomas Aquinas and St. Augustine agree that Jesus performed a similar act twice, with the less severe denunciations of the Johannine account (merchants, sellers) occurring early in Jesus's public ministry and the more severe denunciations of the synoptic accounts (thieves, robbers) occurring just before, and indeed expediting, the events of the crucifixion.

Claims about the Temple cleaning episode in the Gospel of John can be combined with non-biblical historical sources to obtain an estimate of when it occurred.
John 2:13 states that Jesus went to the Temple in Jerusalem around the start of his ministry and John 2:20 states that Jesus was told: "Forty and six years was this temple in building, and you want to raise it up in three days?"

In the Antiquities of the Jews, first-century historian Flavius Josephus wrote that (Ant 15.380) the temple reconstruction was started by Herod the Great in the 18th year of his reign 22 BC, two years before Augustus arrived in Syria in 20 BC to return the son of Phraates IV and receive in return the spoils and standards of three Roman legions (Ant 15.354). Temple expansion and reconstruction was ongoing, and it was in constant reconstruction until it was destroyed in 70 AD by the Romans. Given that it had taken 46 years of construction to that point, the Temple visit in the Gospel of John has been estimated at any time between 24–29 AD. It is possible that the complex was only a few years completed when the future Emperor Titus destroyed the Temple in 70 AD.

Analysis

Professor David Landry of the University of St. Thomas suggests that "the importance of the episode is signaled by the fact that within a week of this incident, Jesus is dead. Matthew, Mark, and Luke agree that this is the event that functioned as the 'trigger' for Jesus' death."

Butler University professor James F. McGrath explains that the animal sales were related to selling animals for use in the animal sacrifices in the Temple. He also explains that the moneychangers in the temple existed to convert the many currencies in use into the accepted currency for paying the Temple taxes. E. P. Sanders and Bart Ehrman say that Greek and Roman currency was converted to Jewish and Tyrian money.

A common interpretation is that Jesus was reacting to the practice of money changers routinely cheating the people, but Marvin L. Krier Mich observes that a good deal of money was stored at the temple, where it could be loaned by the wealthy to the poor who were in danger of losing their land to debt. The Temple establishment therefore co-operated with the aristocracy in the exploitation of the poor. One of the first acts of the First Jewish-Roman War was the burning of the debt records in the archives.

Pope Francis sees the Cleansing of the Temple not as a violent act but more of a prophetic demonstration. In addition to writing and speaking messages from God, Israelite or Jewish nevi'im ("spokespersons", "prophets") often acted out prophetic actions in their life.

According to D.A. Carson, the fact that Jesus was not arrested by the Temple guards was due to the fact that the crowd supported Jesus's actions. Maurice Casey agrees with this view, stating that Temple's authorities were probably afraid that sending guards against Jesus and his disciples would cause a revolt and a carnage, while Roman soldiers in the Antonia Fortress did not feel the need to act for a minor disturbance such as this; however, Jesus's actions probably prompted the authorities' decision to have Jesus arrested some days later and later had him crucified by Roman prefect Pontius Pilate.

Interpretation of John 2:15 
In 2012, Andy Alexis-Baker, clinical associate professor of theology at Loyola University Chicago, gave the history of the interpretation of the Johannine passage since Antiquity:

 Origen (3rd century) is the first to comment on the passage: he denies historicity and interprets it as metaphorical, where the Temple is the soul of a person freed from earthly things thanks to Jesus. On the contrary, John Chrysostom (v. 391) defended the historical authenticity of this passage, but if he considered that Jesus had used the whip against the merchants in addition to the other beasts, he specified that it was to show his divinity and that Jesus was not to be imitated.
 Theodore of Mopsuestia (in 381) – who answered, during the First Council of Constantinople, to the bishop Rabbula, accused of striking his clerics and to justify himself by the purification of the Temple – and Cosmas Indicopleustes (v. 550) supported that the event is non-violent and historical: Jesus whips sheep and bulls, but speaks only to merchants and only overturns their tables.
 Augustine of Hippo (in 387) referred to cleansing of the temple to justify rebuking others for their sinful behavior writing, "Stop those whom you can, restrain whom you can, frighten whom you can, allure gently whom you can, do not, however, rest silent."
 Pope Gregory VII (in 1075), quoting Pope Gregory I, relies on this passage to justify his policy against simoniacal clergy, comparing them to merchants. Other medieval Catholic figures will do the same, such as Bernard of Clairvaux, who justified the Crusades by claiming that fighting the "pagans" with the same zeal that Jesus displayed against the merchants was a way to salvation.
 During the Protestant Reformation, John Calvin (in 1554), in line with Augustine of Hippo and the Gregories, defended himself by using (among other things) the purification of the temple, when he was accused of having helped to burn alive Michael Servetus, a theologian who denied the divinity of Jesus.
 Andy Alexis-Baker indicates that, while the majority of English-speaking Bibles include humans, sheep and cattle in the whipping, the original text is more complex, and after grammatical analysis concludes that the text does not describe a violent act of Jesus against the merchants.

According to later sources

Toledot Yeshu
There are a number of later embellishments to the narrative of the incident that are generally regarded as legendary or polemical by scholars. The Toledot Yeshu, a parody gospel probably first written down about 1,000 years later but possibly dependent on second-century Jewish-Christian gospel if not oral traditions that might go back all the way to the formation of the canonical narratives themselves, claims that Yeshu had entered the Temple with 310 of his followers. That Christ's followers had indeed entered the Temple, and in fact the Holy of Holies, is also claimed by Epiphanius, who claims that James wore the breastplate of the high priest and the high priestly diadem on his head and actually entered the Holy of Holies, and that John the Beloved had become a sacrificing priest who wore the mitre, which was the headdress of the high priest.

Yeshu was likewise accused of robbing the shem hamephorash, the 'secret name of god' from the Holy of Holies, in the Toledot Yeshu.

In art
The cleansing of the Temple is a commonly depicted event in the Life of Christ, under various titles.

El Greco painted several versions:
Christ Driving the Money Changers from the Temple (El Greco, London)
Christ Driving the Money Changers from the Temple (El Greco, Madrid)
Christ Driving the Money Changers from the Temple (El Greco, Minneapolis)
Christ Driving the Money Changers from the Temple (El Greco, New York)
Christ Driving the Money Changers from the Temple (El Greco, Washington)

Gallery

See also 
 
 Gessius Florus
 Gospel harmony
 Ministry of Jesus

References 
 Brown, Raymond E. An Introduction to the New Testament, Doubleday (1997) 
 Brown, Raymond E. The New Jerome Biblical Commentary, Prentice Hall (1990) 
 Miller, Robert J. The Complete Gospels, Polebridge Press (1994), 
 Myers, Ched. Binding the Strong Man: A political reading of Mark's story of Jesus. Orbis (1988)

Notes

External links

Passion of Jesus
Gospel episodes
Second Temple